The 1965 Princeton Tigers football team was an American football team that represented Princeton University during the 1965 NCAA University Division football season. After winning the Ivy League championship the previous year, Princeton dropped to second place.

In their ninth year under head coach Dick Colman, the Tigers compiled an 8–1 record and outscored opponents 281 to 100. G. Paul Savidge was the team captain.

Princeton's 6–1 conference record was the second-best in the Ivy League standings; their only loss was to the conference champion, undefeated Dartmouth, in the final week. The Tigers outscored Ivy opponents 222 to 94. 

Princeton played its home games at Palmer Stadium on the university campus in Princeton, New Jersey.

Schedule

References

Princeton
Princeton Tigers football seasons
Princeton Tigers football